Turaghay (also Romanized as Ţūrāghāy and Ţowrāghā'ī) is a village in Leylan-e Shomali Rural District, Leylan District, Malekan County, East Azerbaijan Province, Iran. At the 2006 census, its population was 636, in 160 families.

References 

Populated places in Malekan County